Thimbleby is a small village and civil parish in the Hambleton District of North Yorkshire, England, it is in the North Yorks Moors and close to the village of Osmotherley and the Cleveland Way, 6 miles east of Northallerton. The population of the civil parish as of the 2011 census was 258.

Thimbleby Estate                                                                                                                                                                                    
Thimbleby Hall sits 1 mile north-east of the centre of the village, the estate lies within the North York Moors National Park and was listed in the Domesday Book as the property of the King family of Northallerton Manor. It was later granted to the Bishops of Durham, when part of the Estate was gifted to Rievaulx Abbey. At one time the size of the estate was in excess of 20,000 acres.

In the late 12th century, Bishop Hugh Pudsey granted Thimbleby Hall to his steward Philip Colville, after which it remained in the Colville family until 1418, when Sir John Colville was executed for treason at York, an event mentioned in Shakespeare's Henry IV Part II. The estate then passed via the Wandesfords to the Peirse family of Hutton Bonville.

The Peirse Family built the present Georgian hall, which was extended in Victorian and Edwardian times, it was mainly used as a shooting lodge by the family. In the 1920s the hall was reduced in size, when a complete storey was removed from the centre block. A major restoration took place in the 1980s.  

In 2005, the hall along with the 3,000 acre estate was sold to Andrea Shelley (b. 1961) and her husband Andrew (b. 1960), Andrea is the eldest child of the late Sir Ken Morrison, the Yorkshire entrepreneur who created the Morrisons supermarket empire, Andrea and her siblings William Morrison and Eleanor Kernighan are reported by The Sunday Times to be worth in excess of £700 million. The present owners further renovated the hall, addding a wing and garages in 2011. Within the grounds are several listed buildings including the Grade II listed gate lodges and a dovecot which sits alongside a lake.

Throughout its long history, The Thimbleby Estate has always remained in private ownership, to this day it is still a working estate, including grouse moors, a simulated shooting business, forestry and farming.

References

External links

Villages in North Yorkshire
Civil parishes in North Yorkshire